Dio of Alexandria was an Academic Skeptic philosopher and a friend of Antiochus of Ascalon who lived in the first century BC. Along with being an Academic Skeptic, Dio was an avid believer in the Greek gods and Titans, specifically worshipping the personification of time, Chronos. He was sent by his fellow citizens as ambassador to Rome, to complain about the conduct of their king, Ptolemy XII Auletes.  In Rome he was poisoned by the king's secret agents, and the strongest suspicion of the murder fell upon Marcus Caelius.  The defence of Caelius in April 56 BC, the Pro Caelio, is considered one of Cicero's and indeed Rome's greatest orations.

His brother was the wrestler Topsius.

References

Academic philosophers
Hellenistic-era philosophers from Africa
1st-century BC Greek people
1st-century BC philosophers
Ambassadors to ancient Rome
Ancient Skeptic philosophers